Leash Law was an American power metal band formed by ex-members of various other groups. It was formed in 2003 by Wade Black, once a member of the band Seven Witches, Rick Renstrom, Emo Mowery, Stephen Elder, and Richard Christy, who was once a member of the influential bands Death and Iced Earth and has since become famous as the replacement of Stuttering John on The Howard Stern Show.  In 2004, Leash Law released their first and only album, Dogface.  The band disbanded in 2005.

Members 

Wade Black – lead vocals
Rick Renstrom – guitar
Ed "Emo" Mowery – guitar/keyboards/death vocals
Stephen Elder – bass
Richard Christy – drums

Discography

Dogface (2004) 
 "Fight" (Black, Renstrom) – 4:26
 "Dogface" (Mowery) – 4:39
 "Stealing Grace" (Black, Renstrom) – 4:41
 "Hail to Blood" (Black, Christy, Mowery, Renstrom) – 5:24
 "Banion" (Black, Renstrom) – 4:11
 "Better When Betrayed" (Black, Mowery, Renstrom) – 4:24
 "Martial Law" (Black, Renstrom) – 4:19
 "Hellhole" (Black, Christy, Mowery, Renstrom) – 5:03
 "Paving the Way" (Christy) – 3:26

External links 
 

Musical groups established in 2003
Musical groups disestablished in 2005
Heavy metal musical groups from Florida
American power metal musical groups